Ontario College of Art & Design University, commonly known as OCAD University or OCAD, is a public art university located in Toronto, Ontario, Canada. The university's main campus is spread throughout several buildings and facilities within downtown Toronto. The university is a co-educational institution which operates three academic faculties, the Faculty of Art, the Faculty of Arts and Science, and the Faculty of Design. The university also provides continuing education services through its School of Continuing Studies. 

Established in 1876 as the Ontario School of Art by the Ontario Society of Artists, it is the oldest operating school in Canada dedicated to art education. The institution was renamed twice in 1886 and 1890 before it was granted a provincial charter and renamed the Ontario College of Art (OCA) in 1912. The institution was known as the OCA until 1996 when it was renamed the Ontario College of Art and Design. The institution was granted university status in 2002 and was empowered to grant certain academic degrees. University was adopted as a part of the institution's name in 2010, to reflect its change in status. In 2020, the university was empowered with full degree-granting authority from the Government of Ontario.

In 2021, there were 4,600 undergraduates and 390 graduate students enrolled at the university. As of 2022, the university holds an association with over 25,000 alumni.

History
The institution was established by the Ontario Society of Artists in 1876 as the Ontario School of Art, whose objective it was to provide professional artistic training, and further the development of art education in Ontario. The Ontario Society of Artists passed the motion to "draw up a scheme" for a school of art on 4 April 1876, and the first Ontario School of Art opened on 30 October 1876, funded by a government grant of $1,000. The school opened at 14 King Street West with an initial enrolment of 14 students.

Thomas Mower Martin was the founding director until 1879. Robert Harris taught at the school as did William Cruikshank, who also served as president from 1884 to 1886.
 
In 1882, the provincial department of education assumed control over the institution and relocated the school to the Toronto Normal School building. In 1886, the school was relocated to another location on Queen and Yonge Street, and renamed the Toronto Art School.

The Ontario Society of Artists resumed its sponsorship of the institution in 1890 and relocated the institution to 173 King Street West, occupying the upper levels of the Princess Theatre building, and shared the premises with the Art Museum of Toronto. The society reopened the school as the  Central Ontario School of Art and Industrial Design.

20th century
In 1910, the school was relocated to 1 College Street as a result of the Princess Theatre's demolition.

In 1912, the institution was granted a charter by the province and incorporated as the Ontario College of Art (OCA) and was relocated back to the Toronto Normal School. The new charter granted the institution the authority to issue diplomas. George Agnew Reid was named the school's first principal. Reid designed the first building owned by the college, a purpose-built two-storey building fronting onto Grange Park. The building was the "first building in Canada built specifically for the education of professional artists and designers." The college relocated to the new property in 1921. 

As a part of Reid's wider efforts to have visual arts accepted as a part of the province's education system, Reid had pushed for the OCA to become a constituent college of the University of Toronto so OCA students could obtain degrees. However, the potential amalgamation was never pursued. 

In 1945, the school established a design school, broadening its education mandate. By the 1950s, the institution had expanded beyond its campus, operating classes in Port Hope, Ontario, and assuming control of the William Houston Public School (presently part of York University's Glendon Campus). In 1957, it expanded opened its first expansion to its main building.

In 1971–72, Roy Ascott radically challenged the pedagogy and curriculum structure of the college. In 1974, the institution established its Florence foreign exchange program, where a building in Florence was leased to house studio spaces for students in the program. The program was staffed by the institution's faculty members until the program's cancellation in 2017.

The main campus was significantly enlarged during the 1980s. From 1979 to 1997, the institution also held classes at the Stewart Building, a building located north of the main campus. 

The institution remained the Ontario College of Art until 1996 when it was renamed the Ontario College of Art and Design (OCAD). The name change was intended to raise the institution's media and industrial profile, as well as better position it for a transition from a diploma- to the degree-granting institution. In the following year, the university entered into a partnership with Open University to provide OCAD students with the opportunity to obtain an Open University degree.

21st century
In 2002, the provincial legislature granted university status to OCAD along with the limited authority to confer bachelor's degrees in fine arts and design in its name. In 2007, OCAD was given limited authority to confer graduate degrees and accepted its first cohort of graduate students the next year. In 2008, the college was granted membership into the Association of Universities and Colleges of Canada. In 2009, the university began to provide continuing education services.

The institution saw changes in its pedagogy early into Sara Diamond's tenure as OCAD's president (2005 to 2020). She emphasized academics over studio time, increasing the independence of the academic deans and requiring full-time instructors to hold a graduate degree. There was some controversy as two faculty members resigned over the changes. Diamond also changed the curriculum to reduce the amount of classroom time versus studio time, increased the academic rigour the program, and pushed for digital media and design research classes. 

In 2010, the institution was renamed the Ontario College of Art and Design University. In the same year, Tom Traves, then president of Dalhousie University in Halifax, conducted a confidential review of how OCAD was managed. He found that the number of senior faculty and administrators was excessive. Diamond adopted most of his 30 recommendations, including increased Decanal autonomy. 

OCAD University was awarded full degree awarding powers including honorary degrees on 1 July 2020 by the Government of Ontario.

Campus

The university's campus is spread across several buildings within downtown Toronto. The university is interwoven with the surrounding urban area. Buildings at the main campus are situated within two areas, a northern cluster built in the Grange Park neighbourhood around McCaul Street between Dundas and Queen Street, and a southern cluster in the Entertainment District built around Richmond Street West. In addition to the main campus, the university also operates a satellite campus in East Bayfront.

The northern cluster includes the Main Building (including the George Reid Wing and the Rosalie Sharp Centre for Design), the Annex Building, the Rosalie Sharp Pavillion, 49-51 McCaul Street, and 74–76 McCaul Street. The George Reid Wing and 74–76 McCaul Street are both designated buildings under the Ontario Heritage Act. The latter building is rented out by the university to a privately-run art supply store.

The southern cluster is made up of three buildings, 205 Richmond Street West and 230–240 Richmond Street West. The former building was acquired by the university in 2007, while the latter two interconnected buildings were acquired the following year. In addition to university facilities, 230–240 Richmond Street West also holds spaces leased to WeWork. In 2020, Sun Life Financial and BentallGreenOak acquired a 50 per cent ownership stake in 230–240 Richmond Street West from the university.

The university is considered a commuter school, as the university does not operate a student housing service or have any student residences on its campus. However, the university does operate other student facilities like a student centre opened at 51 McCaul Street in 2007.

Academic buildings 
Academic buildings include the Rosalie Sharp Pavilion and the Main Building. The Main Building is made up of several components including the George Reid House and the Rosalie Sharp Centre for Design. 

The Rosalie Sharp Pavillion is located adjacent to the Main Building and is named after Rosalie Sharp, an alumna of the university. In 2016, the pavilion underwent extensive renovations as a part of the university's Creative City Campus project. Designed by Toronto-based architecture firm Bortolotto, the renovated exterior for the 2.5 storey pavilion incorporated a stainless steel facade scrim design that acts as "gateway" into the university campus. The pavilion houses the university's Experimental Learning Centre and the Centre for Emerging Artists and Designers.

Main Building

The earliest component of the Main Building, the George Reid House, was opened in 1921 and was designed by George Agnew Reid, an alumnus and principal at the Ontario College of Art. The George Reid House was the first building in Canada built specifically for art education. The building was designed in a Georgian style to match The Grange manor adjacent to it.

On 17 January 1957, the first extension to the Main Building was opened, a modernist extension known today as the A. J. Casson Wing. Two more extensions to the building were subsequently added in 1963 and 1967, the former adding the Nora E. Vaughan Auditorium, and the latter adding two additional floors and an atrium into the building.

In 2000, funding was secured from Ontario’s SuperBuild program to build a fifth extension to the Main Building. Through Rod Robbie of Robbie/Young + Wright Architects, Will Alsop of Alsop Architects was made aware of the project and was eventually selected in 2002. A joint venture was formed between the two firms and the new extension, now known as the Rosalie Sharp Centre for Design, was completed in 2004. The design, which came out of a process of participatory design, consists of a box four storeys off the ground supported by a series of multi-coloured pillars at different angles and is often described as a tabletop. The $42.5-million expansion and redevelopment has received numerous awards, including the first Royal Institute of British Architects Worldwide Award, the award of excellence in the "Building in Context" category at the Toronto Architecture and Urban Design Awards, and was deemed the most outstanding technical project overall in the 2005 Canadian Consulting Engineering Awards.

Library facilities
OCAD University Library is the academic library system for the university. In 2011, OCAD University's library collection held 65,928 print monograph volumes, 76,089 electronic monograph volumes, 4,421 film and video materials, 3,284 electronic serials, 827 audio materials, and over 455,000 graphic materials. Most of the print collection is specific to visual art and design.

The library operates three facilities, the Dorothy H. Hoover Library, The Library Learning Zone, and the University Archives. The former two facilities are both located within the Annex Building, with the Dorothy H. Hoover Library relocating there in 1999, and The Library Learning Zone opening in the same building in 2009. The University Archives is located at 230 Richmond Street. The Dorothy H. Hoover Library is open to the public, whereas access to the Library Learning Zone and University Archives is restricted to OCAD University students except during public events and exhibitions.

The Dorothy H. Hoover Library is a general study and research library for art and design and was renamed after OCAD U Library's first head librarian in 1987. The library offers several proactive information literacy programming to support academic research. The library also operates an exhibition program to provide support for studio practice. The Library Learning Zone is a studio-based study space and work area. Opened in 2009, The Learning Zone was created to fill the need for informal community spaces and study areas, as the campus has no student residences. The design for the space was based on the Learning Zone at the University of the Arts London.

OCAD University Library is a member of four library consortiums including the Art Libraries Society of North America and the Ontario Council of University Libraries.

Galleries

OCAD University operates seven galleries and spaces that exhibit art from students, faculty members, and other artists. These include the Ignite Gallery, The Great Hall, The Learning Zone, and the Open Space Gallery. The Open Space Gallery is also used to exhibit projects from graduate students and faculty. Some galleries provide priority access to certain students, with graduate students given priority to the Graduate Gallery, and the Ada Slaight Gallery being used primarily by criticism and curatorial practice students to apply their education.

The Onsite Gallery is the university's public gallery that primarily exhibits Indigenous art, as well as other pieces that examine different issues in Canada and other parts of the world. The gallery was opened in September 2017. The gallery was initially established as the OCAD Professional Gallery in 2007, before changing its name to the Onsite Gallery in 2010.

In addition to galleries maintained by OCAD University, the university also has a partnership with Partial Gallery to showcase and sell art from students and graduates.

Off-campus facilities
In addition to its main campus in Grange Park and the Entertainment District, the university also operates a satellite "waterfront campus" at 130 Queens Quay East in East Bayfront. The waterfront campus was opened to the public in 2018 and occupies  of leased space in a multi-use building that includes offices and residential condominiums. The campus houses OCAD U CO, a business incubator operated by the university. The building forms a part of a larger complex, the Daniels Waterfront—City of the Arts, which also holds George Brown College's waterfront campus.

Sustainability
The Sustainability Committee is a sub-committee that is charged with creating and implementing sustainable operating practices throughout the university's facilities. In 2009, the university, along with the other members from the Council of Ontario Universities, signed a pledge known as Ontario Universities Committed to a Greener World, to transform its campus into a model of environmental responsibility.

Administration
OCAD University is a publicly funded university. The university operates under a bicameral system with a board of governors and a senate empowered by provincial legislation, the Ontario College of Act and Design University Act. The Act was last amended in 2010 when the institution adopted its present name. The 2010 amendments also formalized the role of the university chancellor, as well as converted the former academic council into the academic senate and broadened its duties.

The university's board of governors is charged with the management of university affairs and making major operational decisions. The board has 18 members, including six individuals appointed by Government of Ontario and two members elected by OCAD University alumni. Eight members are drawn from the existing community at OCAD, with some being faculty members appointed by the Senate, and others being elected by staff and student representatives. The senate is responsible for the educational policies of the university. The Senate is primarily made up of faculty members, although it also includes representatives from the university's administration, as well as the undergraduate and graduate student body.

The chancellor serves as the titular head of the university and is primarily charged with the conferment of degrees. The chancellor is appointed by the board of governors to a four-year term. The university has named five chancellors, the last being Jamie Watt, who began their four-year tenure on 1 January 2022. The board of governors is also empowered to appoint the university president, who acts as the chief executive officer for the university and on the board's behalf with respects to the institution's operations. By virtue of their office, the president is also the chair of the senate. Ana Serrano is the current president of the university, having assumed the position on July 2020.

Academics
OCAD University is a comprehensive art, design and media post-secondary institution. The university's academic year has two terms, Fall/Winter and Spring/Summer, with each term containing two semesters. The former term runs from September to April, while the latter runs from May through August. 

The university is organized into three faculties, the Faculty of Art, the Faculty of Arts and Science, and the Faculty of Design. As of 2022, the three faculties offer 18 undergraduate programs and seven graduate programs. Graduate programs are coordinated through the School of Graduate Studies. In the 2020–21 academic year, the university had an enrolment of over 4,100 full-time undergraduate and graduate students. In the same year, there were 2,345 people enrolled in an OCAD University School of Continuing Studies course. In the 2020–21 academic year, the university's faculty included 151 full-time members, and 294 part-time faculty members. 

In 2020, the university reported a six-year graduation rate of 59 per cent with its September 2014 cohort. In 2018, the university conferred 670 bachelor's degrees and 89 master's degrees. Undergraduate degrees conferred by the university includes Bachelor of Arts, Bachelor of Design, and Bachelor of Fine Arts. Graduate degrees issued by the university include Master of Arts, Master of Design, and Master of Fine Arts.

Quality control of academics is maintained by the Ontario University Council on Quality Assurance. The university holds membership in several national and international post-secondary organizations, such as the Association of Independent Colleges of Art and Design and Universities Canada.

Reputation
In the 2022 QS World University Rankings for the subject of art and design, OCAD placed 101–150 out of 230 universities.

Research

As of 2022, the university operates over 20 research centres and labs, including the INVC Research Centre, the Inclusive Design Research Centre (IDRC). The latter is a research centre focused on inclusive design and coordinates the Inclusive Design Institute. 

During the 2020–21 academic year, the university received over $7.2 million in contributions for research purposes. As of 2022, four faculty members from the university are Canada Research Chairs. Three chairholders are part of the Social Sciences and Humanities Research Council, while the other is a part of the Natural Sciences and Engineering Research Council. In the 2019–20 academic year, the university received 24 research awards and $690,625 in funding from the Social Sciences and Humanities Research Council of Canada.

The university is a part of several research networks and joint-research projects, including the Centre for Innovation in Information Visualization and Data-Driven Design, and the Inclusive Design Institute. The former is a research project led by York University in partnership with OCAD, the University of Toronto, and other private sector partners to develop a new design, analytics and visualization techniques for new computational tools. The latter organization serves as a hub for research into inclusive designs for information and communications technology. The Inclusive Design Institute serves as a hub for research into inclusive designs for information and communications technology. The institute is coordinated by the IRDC and is headed by Jutta Treviranus, an OCAD University faculty member. The institute has eight partner post-secondary institutions, and is headed at OCAD University's campus.

In addition to research centres and labs, the university also supports two business incubators, the Imagination Catalyst and the Mobile Experience Innovation Centre. The Imagination Catalyst is coordinated through the Digital Futures Implementation office, which provides incubator support for students, alumni, and faculty, and was established in August 2011 through the merger of the Digital Futures Accelerator and the Design Incubator. The Mobile Experience Innovation Centre is another incubator with a focus on applied research in mobile technology.

Admissions
The requirements for admission differ between students from Ontario, students from other provinces in Canada, and students based outside of Canada, due to the lack of uniformity in marking schemes between provinces and countries. In addition to academic requirements, the university also requires applicants whose first language is not English to present proof that they are proficient in the English language. The university's undergraduate admission process includes an interview, an essay, and a portfolio submission.

In 2017, the university reported a retention rate of 92.2 per cent of first-year students that advanced to their second year.

Student life

In 2021, the university's student body included over 4,600 full-time and part-time undergraduate students, as well as 390 full-time and part-time graduate students. At the start of the 2020–21 academic year, the student body was primarily made up of Canadians, with approximately 74.7 per cent of all OCAD students holding Canadian citizenship. Many domestic students receive financial aid through the federal Canada Student Loan program, and the provincial Ontario Student Assistance Program. In the 2019–20 academic year, approximately 67 per cent of first-year full-time undergraduates received some form of financial aid. In that year, the average amount received from each recipient was $6,830.

The university's student body population is represented by the OCAD Student Union (OCADSU), which is a member organization of the Canadian Federation of Students. Services provided by OCADSU include academic advocacy, legal services, and student grants. In addition to OCADSU, several cultural, social, and recreational student groups are officially registered with the university.

Insignias

The institution used a logo as early as 1903 to serve as a visual identifier. Since that time, the institution has used at least nine logos. The present logo was introduced in 2011, coinciding with the institution's name change to OCAD University in 2010. The 2011 logo was designed by Bruce Mau Design and uses Gotham typeface.

Notable people

Several individuals are associated with the university either as alumni, or members of its administration or faculty. As of 2022, there were over 25,000 OCAD University alumni worldwide. Alumni can join the OCAD Alumni Association, an independent group of OCAD graduates.

Several alumni and faculty members have gained prominence in the field of visual arts and design. This includes several members from the Group of Seven, including Franklin Carmichael, A. J. Casson, A. Y. Jackson, Franz Johnston, Arthur Lismer, J. E. H. MacDonald, and Frederick Varley; as well as several members from the Painters Eleven, including Jack Bush and Harold Town. Other notable alumni and faculty members from the institution include Barbara Astman, Aba Bayefsky, J. W. Beatty, David Blackwood, David Bolduc, Dennis Burton, Ian Carr-Harris, Charles Comfort, Graham Coughtry, Greg Curnoe, Ken Danby, Allan Fleming, Richard Gorman, Fred S. Haines, Yvonne McKague Housser, Charles William Jefferys, Burton Kramer, Nobuo Kubota, Isabel McLaughlin, Lucius Richard O'Brien, John Scott, Michael Snow, Lisa Steele, and Colette Whiten.

See also

Education in Toronto
Higher education in Ontario
List of art schools
List of universities in Ontario

Notes

References

Further reading

External links

 

 
Art schools in Canada
Universities and colleges in Toronto
Universities in Ontario
Educational institutions established in 1876
Will Alsop buildings
Art museums and galleries in Ontario
Museums in Toronto
1876 establishments in Ontario